Monaghan is a barony in County Monaghan, Republic of Ireland.

Etymology
Monaghan barony takes its name from Monaghan town ("abounding in thickets").

Location

Monaghan is found in central County Monaghan.

Monaghan barony is bordered to the north by Trough; to the southwest by Dartree; to the southeast by Cremorne (all the preceding are also in County Monaghan);  to the east by Tiranny, County Armagh; and to the west by Magherastephana and Clankelly, County Fermanagh.

History
The MacMahons were chiefs in medieval times.

List of settlements

Below is a list of settlements in Monaghan barony:
Ballinode
Monaghan
Scotstown
Smithborough

References

Baronies of County Monaghan